Sagami may refer to:
Sagami, an 11th-century waka poet
Sagami Province, an old province in Japan
Sagami River, a river in Kanagawa and Yamanashi
Sagami Bay, a bay south of Kanagawa Prefecture in Honshū
Sagami Line, a railway roughly along the east bank of the Sagami River
Sagami Railway, a railway company operating three lines in Kanagawa Prefecture, Japan
Sagami Railway Main Line, a railway line extending from Yokohama to Ebina
Sagami Railway Izumino Line, a railway line extending from Futamatagawa in Yokohama to Shōnandai in Fujisawa
Sagami-ji, a Buddhist temple in Hyōgo, Japan